Ahmed Tawfik (born 1 October 1991), is an Egyptian footballer who plays for Egyptian Premier League side Pyramids, as a defensive midfielder.

Club career

Early career
Ahmed Tawfik started his career at El Mansoura before moving to Zamalek in 2010.

In 2018, Ahmed Tawfik joined Pyramids FC.

International career
Ahmed Tawfik played for Egypt at U-20 level in 2010.

Personal life
His brothers Abdelaziz and Akram are also professional footballers.

Honours and achievements

Club
Zamalek SC
Egyptian Premier League: 2014–15
Egypt Cup: 2013, 2014, 2015, 2016, 2018
Egyptian Super Cup: 2016

References

1991 births
Living people
People from Sharqia Governorate
Egyptian footballers
Egypt youth international footballers
Egypt international footballers
Association football midfielders
Egyptian Premier League players
El Mansoura SC players
Zamalek SC players
Pyramids FC players
Al Ittihad Alexandria Club players